Heleopera is a genus of Amoebozoa. It includes the following species.

 Heleopera sphagni
 Heleopera rosea
 Heleopera sylvatica
 Heleopera petricola

References

External links

Amoebozoa genera
Taxa named by Joseph Leidy